Annandale, an electoral district of the Legislative Assembly in the Australian state of New South Wales, had two incarnations, the first from 1894 to 1920, the second from 1927 to 1950.


Members

Elections in the 1940s

1947

Sitting Labor MP Bob Gorman was returned with an increased majority defeating  candidate George Stanley, a first time candidate who never stood again.

1944

Sitting Labor MP Bob Gorman was returned with a significantly reduced majority defeating  candidate Ross Pryor and Independent Arthur Hagen two first time candidates who never stood again.

1941

Sitting Labor MP Bob Gorman was returned with an increased majority defeating Independent candidate Stanley Moran who stood as a Communist in the 1932 election in the seat of Glebe and first time New Social Order candidate Harry Blackwell who never stood again.

Elections in the 1930s

1938

1935

Sitting State Labor MP Bob Gorman was returned with an increased majority defeating John Keegan who stood as the Federal Labor candidate in the 1932 election in the seat of Georges River.

1933 by-election

1932

In 1931, the New South Wales Labor Party split from Federal Labor to form the Australian Labor Party (NSW) led by Jack Lang. In this election, Federal Labor ran candidates in 43 seats but none were elected. Sitting MP Robert Stuart-Robertson was returned with a reduced majority defeating four first time candidates: Leo Bolsdon from the UAP, Communist Robert Brechin, Independent Christopher Hade and the Federal Labor candidate Percival McDonald. Bolsdon and Hade never stood again. He also defeated Independent Harry Meatheringham standing in his sixth and final election.

1931 by-election

1930

Sitting Labor MP Robert Stuart-Robertson was returned with a significant increased majority, defeating Nationalist Osterley Thompson and Communist Mary Lamm, two first time candidates who never stood again.

Elections in the 1920s

1927

Sitting Labor MP for Balmain Robert Stuart-Robertson defeated Nationalist Edward Hogan, a first time candidate who did not stand again.

1920 - 1927
District abolished

Elections in the 1910s

1917

Sitting MP and senior cabinet minister on the Holman government Arthur Griffith had left the Labor Party in the conscription split of 1916 but did not follow William Holman into the Nationalist Party instead becoming an Independent Labor. In the election, Griffith was defeated by William O'Brien, a first time Labor candidate. When the seat was abolished in 1920, O'Brien went onto serve two terms as one of the MPs for Murray.

1913

This was Strachan's second attempt at running for office. He previously stood as an independent in the 1898 election in the seat of Sydney-Lang. Sitting Liberal Reform MP Albert Bruntnell was defeated by the sitting Labor MP for Sturt, Arthur Griffith.

1910

The 6-term sitting Liberal Reform MP William Mahony retired and did not contest this election. Former Liberal Reform MP for Surry Hills Albert Bruntnell, who ran for the seat of Alexandria in 1907 and lost, defeated Labor's George Davidson, a first time candidate who did not stand again.

Elections in the 1900s

1907

This was Cohen's third and final attempt to win the seat of Annandale, this time standing as an Independent. Sitting Liberal Reform MP William Mahony was returned, for the fifth and final time, with a reduced majority.

1904

This was Robertson's first and only attempt at state office. Sitting Liberal Reform MP William Mahony was returned with an increased majority, achieving over 60 percent of the vote for the first time.

1901

This was Kimber's first and only attempt at state office, and was Cohen's second of three attempts to win the seat of Annandale. Sitting MP William Mahony, from the newly formed Liberal Reform Party was returned with a slightly reduced majority. The results were subject re-count by the Elections and Qualifications Committee.

Elections in the 1890s

1898

This was Cohen's first of three attempts to win the seat of Annandale. Sitting Free Trade MP William Mahony was returned with a reduced majority.

1895

This was Skelton's second attempt at colonial office, and Maxwell's and Williams' first. All three unsuccessful candidates never stood for election again. Sitting Free Trade MP William Mahony was returned with an increased and absolute majority.

1894

No sitting MPs contested in this election however this was Young's fifth, and Pritchard's fourth election respectively. Neither had held office previously. Duncan and Larkin were running for the first time. All four unsuccessful candidates never stood for election again. This is also Mahony's first attempt for colonial office. He did not achieve an absolute majority but was declared the winner as this election was first-past-the-post.

Notes

References

New South Wales state electoral results by district